Wando da Costa Silva (born 5 August 1980) is a Brazilian footballer.

In February 2011, Wando joined Korean club Suwon Bluewings on loan for a one-year deal.

References

External links
 

1980 births
Living people
Brazilian footballers
Brazilian expatriate footballers
Expatriate footballers in Iran
Saba players
Paraná Clube players
Botafogo de Futebol e Regatas players
Cruzeiro Esporte Clube players
Águia de Marabá Futebol Clube players
Vila Nova Futebol Clube players
Goiás Esporte Clube players
Suwon Samsung Bluewings players
K League 1 players
Brazilian expatriate sportspeople in South Korea
Expatriate footballers in South Korea
Association football forwards
Sportspeople from Pará